Mački may refer to:

 Mački, Slovenia, a village near Velike Lašče
 Mački, Croatia, a village near Farkaševac